Kings—Hants (formerly Annapolis Valley—Hants and Annapolis Valley) is a federal electoral district in Nova Scotia, Canada, that has been represented in the House of Commons of Canada since 1968.

Demographics

According to the Canada 2016 Census; 2013 representation

Ethnic groups: 91.5% White, 5.3% Aboriginal, 1.6% Black 
Languages: 96.1% English, 1.4% French
Religions (2011): 71.7% Christian (17.4% Baptist, 17.1% Catholic, 15.3% United Church, 12.5% Anglican, 1.7% Presbyterian, 1.5% Pentecostal, 6.1% Other), 27.4% No religion 
Median income (2015): $31,020 
Average income (2015): $39,385

Geography
The district includes all of Hants County and the eastern part of Kings County. Communities include Enfield, Elmsdale, Lantz, Kentville, Windsor and Wolfville.

History
The electoral district was created as "Annapolis Valley in 1966 from parts of Colchester—Hants and Digby—Annapolis—Kings ridings.

In 1996, it was renamed "Kings—Hants". In 2003, it was given its current boundaries: the area encompassed by the provincial electoral district of Kings West was removed from Kings—Hants and added to West Nova. There was no territory changes as a result of the 2012 federal electoral redistribution.

Members of Parliament

This riding has elected the following Members of Parliament:

Scott Brison resigned his seat effective 10 February 2019. Under legislation that had recently come into effect, the seat remained vacant until the next general election.

Election results

Kings—Hants

2021 general election

2019 general election

2015 general election

2011 general election

2008 general election

2006 general election

2004 general election

2000 general election

All changes are based on the 2000 by-election, except the Liberal Party and the Natural Law Party, which did not field a candidate; and Communist Party candidate Graham Jake MacDonald, who ran as an Independent.

2000 by-election

1997 general election

Annapolis Valley—Hants

1993 general election

Changes from the 1988 election for both Progressive Conservative candidate Jim White and Independent candidate Pat Nowlan are based on the same 1988 result, when Pat Nowlan ran as a Progressive Conservative. Independent Rik Gates was the youngest candidate to run for MP at the age of twenty two.

1988 general election

1984 general election

1980 general election

1979 general election

Annapolis Valley

1974 general election

1972 general election

1968 general election

}

See also
 List of Canadian federal electoral districts
 Past Canadian electoral districts

References

Notes

External links
 Riding history for Annapolis Valley—Hants (1976–1996) from the Library of Parliament
 Riding history for Kings—Hants (1996– ) from the Library of Parliament

Nova Scotia federal electoral districts
Kings County, Nova Scotia
Hants County, Nova Scotia